Nordvik Church is a parish church of the Church of Norway in Dønna Municipality in Nordland county, Norway. It is located in the Nordvik area, just north of the village of Solfjellsjøen on the island of Dønna. It is one of the churches for the Dønna parish which is part of the Nord-Helgeland prosti (deanery) in the Diocese of Sør-Hålogaland. The white, wooden church was built in a long church style in 1871 using plans drawn up by the architect Niels Stockfleth Darre Eckhoff. The church seats about 300 people. The building was consecrated on 18 June 1871.

See also
List of churches in Sør-Hålogaland

References

Dønna
Churches in Nordland
Wooden churches in Norway
19th-century Church of Norway church buildings
Churches completed in 1871
1871 establishments in Norway
Long churches in Norway